Ted van Lieshout (born 21 December 1955) is a Dutch poet and writer of children's literature. He has won numerous awards for his work.

Early life 

Van Lieshout was born in 1955 in Eindhoven, Netherlands. Van Lieshout studied Beeldende Kunsten en Vormgeving between 1975 and 1980 at the Gerrit Rietveld Academie in Amsterdam. Until 1990 he was part-time teacher at the Royal Academy of Art in The Hague. After graduating van Lieshout made drawings for the newspaper NRC Handelsblad as well as magazines such as Avenue and Blauw Geruite Kiel, the youth magazine of Vrij Nederland. He also contributed to the television shows Het Klokhuis and Sesamstraat. He became a full-time writer in 1990.

Career 

In 1995, he won the Gouden Griffel award for his book Begin een torentje van niks. This was the first time this award was given for a work of poetry.

Van Lieshout won the Zilveren Zoen for his book Gebr. He also won the Deutscher Jugendliteraturpreis in 1999 for the German translation of the book, Bruder, by Mirjam Pressler. The book has been translated into numerous languages.

In 2001, he won the Nienke van Hichtum-prijs for his book Zeer kleine liefde. In 2009, he won the Theo Thijssen-prijs for his entire oeuvre. In 2012, he won the Woutertje Pieterse Prijs for his book Driedeling paard. Van Lieshout was also nominated for this award in 2016 and 2018 for respectively the books Rond vierkant vierkant rond (2015) and Onder mijn matras de erwt (2017). He also received the Zilveren Griffel award for this book.

Van Lieshout was a finalist for the Hans Christian Andersen Award twice.

Van Lieshout's children's books have been illustrated by various illustrators, including Sieb Posthuma, Annemarie van Haeringen, Daan Remmerts de Vries and Sylvia Weve. Van Lieshout also illustrated many of his books himself. Since 2012 he makes picture books with Philip Hopman: the books about 'Boer Boris', a little farmer boy.

Awards 

 1987: Vlag en Wimpel, Van verdriet kun je grappige hoedjes vouwen
 1989: Vlag en Wimpel, De allerliefste jongen van de hele wereld
 1989: Zilveren Griffel, Och, ik elleboog me er wel doorheen
 1991: Vlag en Wimpel, Ik ben een held
 1991: Zilveren Griffel, Mijn botjes zijn bekleed met deftig vel
 1994: Vlag en Wimpel, Toen oma weg was
 1995: Gouden Griffel Begin een torentje van niks
 1997: Zilveren Griffel, Mijn tuin, mijn tuin
 1997: Zilveren Zoen, Gebr.
 1999: Deutscher Jugendliteraturpreis, Bruder (German translation of Gebr. by Mirjam Pressler)
 2001: Nienke van Hichtum-prijs, Zeer kleine liefde
 2006: Zilveren Griffel, Mama! Waar heb jij het geluk gelaten?
 2009: Theo Thijssen-prijs, entire oeuvre
 2009: Zilveren Griffel, Spin op sokken
 2010: Vlag en Wimpel, Ik wil een naam van chocola
 2010: Zilveren Griffel, Hou van mij
 2012: Vlag en Wimpel, Vijf draken verslagen
 2012: Woutertje Pieterse Prijs, Driedeling paard
 2012: Zilveren Griffel, Driedelig paard
 2014: Vlag en Wimpel, Boer Boris in de sneeuw
 2016: Zilveren Griffel, Rond vierkant vierkant rond
 2019: Boekensleutel, Ze gaan er met je neus vandoor
 2021: Zilveren Griffel, De gemene moord op Muggemietje

References

External links 

 Ted van Lieshout, Nederlands Letterenfonds (Dutch Foundation for Literature)
 Ted van Lieshout (in Dutch), Digital Library for Dutch Literature
 Ted van Lieshout (in Dutch), jeugdliteratuur.org

1955 births
Living people
20th-century Dutch male writers
21st-century Dutch male writers
20th-century Dutch poets
21st-century Dutch poets
Dutch male poets
Dutch children's writers
Woutertje Pieterse Prize winners
Writers from Amsterdam
Nienke van Hichtum Prize winners
Gouden Griffel winners